The International Golf Federation (IGF) was founded in 1958 and is the international federation recognized by the International Olympic Committee (IOC) as the world governing body for golf. The IGF has two membership categories representing the administration of golf internationally:
132 National Federation Members from 126 countries
22 Professional Members, mostly professional golf tours and Professional Golfers Associations

History
The Federation changed its name from the "World Amateur Golf Council" in 2003. It was founded in 1958 for the purpose of arranging international amateur competitions and it organizes two World Amateur Team Championships, the Eisenhower Trophy for men and the Espirito Santo Trophy for women.

Secretariat
The headquarters of the IGF is located by the shores of Lake Geneva in Lausanne, Switzerland.

Jurisdiction
Unlike most internationally recognized sports federations, the IGF is not responsible for developing, maintaining or administering the rules of golf. Instead, the rules are jointly developed and administered by the United States Golf Association (for the United States and Mexico only) and The R&A (the governing body derived from The Royal and Ancient Golf Club of St Andrews, the historical  codifier of the rules of golf).

Events

Olympic Games

Golf was an inaugural Olympic sport at the 1904 Games in St. Louis, Missouri, USA, where the United States and Canada were the only competing countries. The globalization of the sport has meant that following a couple of failed attempts, the International Olympic Committee's executive board approved the inclusion of golf in the Olympics by a vote of 63 votes to 27 in 2009. The sport was included in the 2016 Summer Olympics and the 2020 Olympic Games.

World Amateur Golf Team Championships
The World Amateur Golf Team Championships was started from 1958 and 1964.

Men

The Eisenhower Trophy is a biennial world team championship for amateur men golfers. First held in 1958, the event is named after Dwight D. Eisenhower who was the President of the United States at the time.

Women

The Espirito Santo Trophy is a biennial world team championship for amateur women golfers. It was first held in 1964, organised by Mrs. Henri Prunaret and Lally Segard, and named after Ricardo and Silvia Espirito Santo, friends of Segard who donated the trophy.

Category

National Federations

IGF comprises 132 federations from 126 countries

Continental / Regional Federations
The following seven regional association are formed with the IGF National Membership.
 Africa Golf Confederation
 Americas Golf Association
 Arab Golf Federation
 Asia-Pacific Golf Confederation
 Caribbean Golf Association
 
 South American Golf Federation

See also
SportAccord

References

External links
Official site

 
Golf associations
Amateur golf
Organizations established in 1958